Karakaya is a village in the Üzümlü District, Erzincan Province, Turkey. It had a population of 665 in 2021.

References 

Villages in Üzümlü District